Solidarność: Menadżer Konspiracji is a 2013 Polish educational game.

References 

2013 video games
Cold War video games
Educational video games
Europe-exclusive video games
Video games developed in Poland
Video games set in Poland
Video games set in the 1980s